Mohammad Reza Zahedi is an Iranian senior military officer in the Islamic Revolutionary Guard Corps. He previously commanded its Air Force and Ground Force and currently serves as is one of the top commanders of the Quds Force.

References 

1944 births
Living people
Islamic Revolutionary Guard Corps personnel of the Iran–Iraq War
Military personnel from Isfahan
Islamic Revolutionary Guard Corps brigadier generals
Islamic Revolutionary Guard Corps personnel of the Syrian civil war
Quds Force personnel